Albert Jacobus Bates  (18 April 1941 – 26 October 2021) was a South African rugby union player and coach.

Playing career
He made his test debut for the Springboks during the 1969–70 tour of Britain and Ireland, against  at Twickenham. He also played test matches against the All Blacks in 1970 and the one-off test against  in 1972. He also played in fourteen tour matches, scoring one try for the Springboks.

Test history

See also
List of South Africa national rugby union players – Springbok no. 438

References

1941 births
2021 deaths
South African rugby union players
South Africa international rugby union players
Leopards (rugby union) players
Blue Bulls players
Rugby union players from Germiston
Rugby union flankers